Qingdao Binhai University (is a private institution of tertiary education in Qingdao, Shandong province, China. It was founded in 1992 and was awarded full college status in 2004. Binhai University has its campus in Huangdao District.

External links
 Qingdao Binhai University 
 Qingdao Binhai University 

Universities and colleges in Qingdao